Csaba Vadász (born 25 August 1960) is a Hungarian wrestler. He competed in the men's Greco-Roman 52 kg at the 1988 Summer Olympics.

References

External links
 

1960 births
Living people
Hungarian male sport wrestlers
Olympic wrestlers of Hungary
Wrestlers at the 1988 Summer Olympics
People from Pápa
Sportspeople from Veszprém County